Francesco's Mediterranean Voyage is a BBC Television documentary series first aired in 2008. It follows Venetian architect Francesco da Mosto as he follows the historical Venetian trading route from Venice through the Adriatic Sea, Corinth Canal, Aegean Sea and Dardanelles to Istanbul. This route was taken by, among others, his ancestor Alvise da Mosto. Travelling as a member of the crew of the Camper and Nicholsons ketch Black Swan, along the way he stops off at the ports that were visited by the earlier traders and were in many cases part of the Venetian Empire. The series was written by Da Mosto.

Eden broadcasts edited highlights of the episodes as repeats, seriously shortened to fit the same time slot as the BBC but with commercials replacing much of the content. When this happens the original programmes are removed from the BBC iPlayer. The series was broadcast on BBC Four in 2018.

References

External links
 

2008 British television series debuts
2008 British television series endings
2000s British documentary television series
2000s British travel television series
BBC television documentaries about history
BBC travel television series
Documentary television series about architecture
English-language television shows
Republic of Venice
Television shows set in Croatia
Television shows set in Greece
Television shows set in Italy